Philippos is a masculine given name, cognate to Philip. Notable people with the surname include:

 Philippos Constantinos, Cypriot singer
 Philippos Syrigos (1948–2013), Greek investigative journalist and sports reporter

Greek masculine given names